Wong Chuk Wan is a village in Sai Kung District, Hong Kong.

Administration
Wong Chuk Wan, including Ngong Wo, is a recognized village under the New Territories Small House Policy.

See also
 Sai Kung West Country Park

References

External links

 Delineation of area of existing village Wong Chuk Wan (Sai Kung) for election of resident representative (2019 to 2022)

Villages in Sai Kung District, Hong Kong